The Romaine was the lead ship of her class of frigates of the French Navy.

She took part in the Expédition d'Irlande and in the Battle of Tory Island.

She cruised to New York City in 1802, and was condemned in 1804. In 1805 she was converted to a troop ship but never sailed again, and she was eventually broken up in 1816.

References

Age of Sail frigates of France
Romaine-class frigates
1794 ships
Ships built in France